Thoriosa spinivulva is a spider species of the family Ctenidae that is endemic on São Tomé Island. It was first named in 1910 by Eugène Simon.

Its male holotype measures from 11 to 12 mm and its female holotype measures from 8 to 10 mm.

References

Endemic fauna of São Tomé Island
Ctenidae
Spiders of Africa
Taxa named by Eugène Simon
Spiders described in 1910